The Brill Building is the sixth solo album by American composer and producer Kramer, released on September 25, 2012 by Tzadik Records.

Track listing

 of

Personnel
Adapted from liner notes of The Brill Building.

 Kramer – vocals, instruments, musical arrangement, production, engineering
Additional musicians
 Jad Fair – vocals (9)
 Mike Jones – piano (9)
 R. Stevie Moore – drums (7), guitar (7), vocals (7)
 Daniel C. Smith – vocals (10)

Production and additional personnel
 Heung-Heung Chin – design
 Scott Hull – mastering
 Michael Macioce – photography
 Kazumori Sigiyama – executive producer
 John Zorn – executive producer

Release history

References

External links 
 The Brill Building at Discogs (list of releases)

2012 albums
Covers albums
Kramer (musician) albums
Albums produced by Kramer (musician)
Tzadik Records albums